Meals 4 Heels is a food delivery service and restaurant in Portland, Oregon. Nikeisah Newton founded the food delivery service catering to sex workers and strippers in 2019, and Meals 4 Heels began operating from Redd on Salmon Street in 2021. The company's tagline is "Pro Black, pro Brown, pro trans, pro science, pro hoe." The menu includes vegan noodle bowls. Beth Nakamura of The Oregonian described the food as "health-minded".

References

External links

 

2019 establishments in Oregon
American companies established in 2019
Restaurants in Portland, Oregon